Rupert Ernest Lockwood (10 March 1908 – 8 March 1997) was an Australian journalist and communist activist.

Lockwood was born in Natimuk to newspaper proprietor Alfred Wright Lockwood and Alice Francis. He became a journalist in 1930, working for the Melbourne Herald until 1935, when he went overseas. He worked in Singapore, Japan, China and the United Kingdom before observing the rise of fascism in Germany, Italy and Spain. He returned to Australia in 1938 and joined the Communist Party of Australia (CPA member, 1939 - 1969), on the day Australia declared war. After finding work in the minor labour press he became associate editor and then editor of the Waterside Workers' Federation's Maritime Worker. He played a significant part in the Royal_Commission_on_Espionage (1954–55), in which the government alleged that he was a Russian spy. In 1969 he left the Communist Party, disillusioned after the Soviet invasion of Czechoslovakia.

He wrote several books including:

 The story of Jim Healy (1951)
 America invades Australia (1955)

 Black Armada (1975)

 Humour Is Their Weapon (1985)

 Ship to Shore (1990)

 War on the Waterfront (1987)

Lockwood died in 1997.

Black Armada
Black Armada is an account of an Australian contribution to the making of the Indonesian Republic. Many forces contrived to make this happen: the Australian Government was a Labor government (from late 1941 to December 1949); the Australian shipping unions of the time were largely communist led; a substantial group of Indonesian political prisoners (the Digul|Tanah-Merah prisoners) had been interned in prison camps in Australian; and the Netherlands East Indies government in exile had been installed in Australia, at Wacol, Queensland.

The book details how these forces came together to create mutinies of Indonesian seamen and Australian boycotts at vital Australian ports, starting in September 1945 (with some shipping/waterfront strikes being broken in 1946) but continuing until 1949, affecting Dutch shipping to the Indies, and thus ensuring vital time for Indonesian nationalists to frustrate Dutch plans for post-war reimposition of Dutch colonial rule in Indonesia.

See also
 Black Armada
 Tanah Merah
 Indonesian National Revolution

References

1908 births
1997 deaths
Australia–Indonesia relations
Australia–Netherlands relations
Indonesian National Revolution
Communist Party of Australia members
20th-century Australian journalists
The Herald (Melbourne) people